This was the first edition of the tournament.

Andrea Collarini won the title after defeating Tomás Barrios Vera 6–2, 7–6(7–1) in the final.

Seeds

Draw

Finals

Top half

Bottom half

References

External links
Main draw
Qualifying draw

Brasil Tennis Challenger - 1